Akulik Creek is a stream in North Slope Borough, Alaska, in the United States. It flows to the Chukchi Sea.

Akulik is derived from an Eskimo word meaning "fancy trimming".

See also
 List of rivers of Alaska

References

Rivers of North Slope Borough, Alaska
Rivers of Alaska